Frederick Augustus Rauch [in Germany, Friedrich August Rauch] (27 July 1806, Hesse-Darmstadt - 2 March 1841, Mercersburg, Pennsylvania) was an educator and the founding president of Marshall College. He was a professor of systematic theology and is often credited as the originator of Mercersburg Theology, although Philip Schaff and John Williamson Nevin were more integral in the development of its views.

Biography
He graduated from the University of Marburg, afterward studied at Giessen and Heidelberg, and became extraordinary professor at the University of Giessen. He was appointed to a full professorship at the University of Heidelberg at twenty-four years of age. "Such an appointment at so early an age has to my knowledge only once been repeated in this century, viz., in the case of Friederich Nietzsche, who is considered the profoundest philosophical thinker of modern Germany".

He fled from Germany on account of a public expression of his political views, and landed in the United States in 1831. He learned English in Easton, Pennsylvania, where he gave lessons on the pianoforte, and was for a short time professor of German in Lafayette College.

He was then chosen as principal of a classical school that had been established by the authorities of the German Reformed Church at York, Pennsylvania. A few months later, he was ordained to the ministry and appointed professor of biblical literature in the theological seminary at York, while retaining charge of the academy, which in 1835 moved to Mercersburg. Under his management, the school flourished, and in 1836 was transformed into Marshall College, of which he became the first president.

Rauch died on 2 March 1841. He was buried in Mercersburg; however, his remains were later moved to Lancaster, Pennsylvania.

Writings
Learned in German philosophy and theology, especially Hegelian thought, Rauch's particular contribution was the writing of his book Psychology: Or, A View of the Human Soul; Including Anthropology. This was the first English exposition of Hegelian philosophy for an American audience.

He left in an unfinished state works on "Christian Ethics" and "Aesthetics". A volume of his sermons, edited by Emanuel V. Gerhart, was published under the title The Inner Life of the Christian (Philadelphia, 1856).

Notes

References

Attribution

1806 births
1841 deaths
German philosophers
19th-century German theologians
German Christian theologians
German male non-fiction writers
19th-century male writers
Reformed Church in America members
Presidents of Franklin & Marshall College
University of Marburg alumni
University of Giessen alumni
Heidelberg University alumni
German emigrants to the United States
People from Mercersburg, Pennsylvania